Raisabad (also Romanized as Ra’īsābād) is a village in Tirjerd Rural District, in the Central District of Abarkuh County, Yazd Province, Iran. At the 2006 census, its population was 481, in 123 families.

References 

Populated places in Abarkuh County